Mannakudi  is a village in the  
Aranthangirevenue block of Pudukkottai district, Tamil Nadu, India.

Demographics 

As per the 2001 census, Mannakudi had a total population of  
877 with 437 males and 440 females. Out of the total population 
595 people were literate.

References

Villages in Pudukkottai district